Siam is a person name. People with the name include:

Surname
 Islam Siam (born 1985), Egyptian footballer
 Said Siam (1959–2009), Palestinian politician and Hamas member

Given name
 Siam Hanghal (born 1993), Indian footballer

See also
Siam (disambiguation)